Gadarwara is a city and a municipality since 1867 in Narsinghpur district in the state of Madhya Pradesh, India.
Gadarwara

Geography

It has an average elevation of 354.77 metres (1,163 feet).

Gadarwara lies on the main road from Jabalpur to Mumbai 30 miles west of Narsinghpur civil station. 50 km away, the hill station of Panchmari draws visitors from all over India.

The Shakkar River flows through it rendering the surrounding farmland fertile. The larger Narmada River is 12 km away.

Climate
Gadarwara has a humid subtropical climate typical of north-central India (Madhya Pradesh and southern Uttar Pradesh). Summer begins in late March, lasting until June. May is the hottest month, with the average temperature exceeding . Summer is followed by the southwest monsoon, which lasts until early October and produces  of rain from July to September. Average annual precipitation is nearly 55 in (1386 mm). Winter begins in late November, and lasts until early March. January is the coldest month, with an average daily temperature near .

Demography
In 1901, town population was 6,198 under the Maratha Empire. Population rose to 25,529 in 1991, 37,861 in 2001, 1,05,726 in 2011 and 1,25,068 in 2019.

Notable people

Indra Bahadur Khare
Maharishi Mahesh Yogi
Rajneesh (Osho)
Ashutosh Rana

References

Cities and towns in Narsinghpur district